Janar Talts (born 7 April 1983) is a former Estonian professional basketball player who is the sporting director of University of Tartu basketball team. Standing at 2.07 m (6 ft 9 in), he played at the power forward and center positions. He represented the Estonian national basketball team internationally.

Professional career
Talts began his professional career in 2001 with TTÜ-A. Le Coq of the Korvpalli Meistriliiga.

In 2002, Talts signed for the Estonian champions Tallinna Kalev. With Tallinna Kalev, he won his first Estonian Championship in the 2002–03 season, after Tallinna Kalev defeated TTÜ/A. Le Coq 4 games to 2 in the KML Finals.

In 2004, Talts joined RheinEnergie Köln of the Basketball Bundesliga, where he signed for the next three seasons. RheinEnergie Köln won the German Championship in the 2005–06 season, after defeating Alba Berlin 3 games to 1 in the Finals. RheinEnergie Köln competed in the 2006–07 Euroleague season, but failed to advance past the group stage with a 2–12 record. Talts averaged 2.9 points and 3.2 rebounds per game.

In 2007, Talts returned to Estonia and signed for TÜ/Rock. TÜ/Rock reached Final Four in the 2007–08 FIBA EuroCup season, but were defeated in the semifinals by Barons LMT 82–88 and in the third place game by AEL Limassol 70–79. Talts won his second Estonian Championship in the 2007–08 season, after TÜ/Rock swept Kalev/Cramo in the KML Finals and was named to the All-KML Team. After finishing the 2008–09 season as runners-up, TÜ/Rock won the 2009–10 Estonian League championship, defeating Kalev/Cramo in the Finals. Talts was named Finals Most Valuable Player and was also named to the All-KML Team.

On 30 December 2010, Talts left TÜ/Rock to join Krasnye Krylya Samara of the Russian Professional Basketball League. Talts left Krasnye Krylya Samara after only three months and joined Cimberio Varese of the Serie A.

On 15 August 2013, returned to TÜ/Rock. TÜ/Rock finished the 2013–14 season as runners-up. Talts averaged 10.81 points and 6.39 rebounds during the season and was named to the All-KML Team. He won his fourth Estonian Championship in the 2014–15 season, after TÜ/Rock defeated Kalev/Cramo in the KML Finals, winning the series 4 games to 1. Talts won the Best Defender Award and was named to the All-KML Team. TÜ/Rock failed to defend the title in the 2015–16 season, losing to Kalev/Cramo in the KML Finals, but Talts was once again named Best Defender.

Estonian national team
As a member of the senior Estonian national basketball team, Talts competed at the EuroBasket 2015, averaging 10.4 points, 0.4 assists, and 4 rebounds in 22.2 minutes per game. Estonia finished the tournament in 20th place.

Career statistics

Euroleague

|-
| style="text-align:left;"| 2006–07
| style="text-align:left;"| RheinEnergie
| 13 || 11 || 16.3 || .283 || .172 || .636 || 3.2 || .5 || .3 || .6 || 2.9 || 1.2
|- class="sortbottom"
| style="text-align:center;" colspan="2" | Career
| 13 || 11 || 16.3 || .283 || .172 || .636 || 3.2 || .5 || .3 || .6 || 2.9 || 1.2

Awards and accomplishments

Professional career
Tallinna Kalev
 Estonian League champion: 2003

RheinEnergie Köln
 German League champion: 2006
 2× German Cup champion: 2005, 2007
 German Super Cup champion: 2006

TÜ/Rock
 3× Estonian League champion: 2008, 2010, 2015
 4× Estonian Cup champion: 2009, 2010, 2013, 2014
 BBL Cup champion: 2010

Individual
 KML Finals Most Valuable Player: 2010
 2× KML Best Defender: 2015, 2016
 6× All-KML Team: 2008, 2009, 2010, 2014, 2015, 2018
 2× KML All-Star: 2002, 2018

References

External links
 Janar Talts at basket.ee 
 Janar Talts at euroleague.net
 Janar Talts at fiba.com

1983 births
Living people
BC Krasnye Krylia players
BC Tallinn Kalev players
Estonian expatriate basketball people in Germany
Estonian expatriate basketball people in Italy
Estonian expatriate basketball people in Russia
Estonian men's basketball players
Köln 99ers players
Korvpalli Meistriliiga players
Pallacanestro Varese players
Power forwards (basketball)
Basketball players from Tallinn
Tartu Ülikool/Rock players